Donald Johnson and Francisco Montana were the defending champions, but did not participate together this year.  Johnson partnered Tomás Carbonell, successfully defending his title.  Montana partnered Chris Haggard, losing in the semifinals.

Carbonell and Johnson won in the final 6–3, 2–6, 6–1, against Jiří Novák and David Rikl.

Seeds

Draw

Finals

References

Portugal Open
1999 ATP Tour
Estoril Open